Brian Muir may refer to:

Brian Muir (footballer) (1936–2020), Australian rules footballer
Brian Muir (racing driver) (1931–1983), Australian auto racing driver
Brian Muir (sculptor) (born 1952), British sculptor who co-created the Darth Vader character from Star Wars
Brian Muir (curator) (1943-1989), see Christchurch Art Gallery

See also
Bryan Muir (born 1973), Canadian hockey player